are a fictional species of monster in the Dragon Quest role-playing video game franchise. Originally inspired by the game Wizardry to be a weak and common enemy for the 1986 video game Dragon Quest, Slimes have appeared in almost every Dragon Quest game since. Their popularity led to the appearance of many varieties of Slimes, including boss characters, friendly allies, and even emerging as the protagonist of the Rocket Slime video game series. Slimes has also appeared in other games property, including Nintendo's Mario and Super Smash Bros. series of crossover fighting games.

Their friendliness, limited power, and appealing form have caused the Slime to become a popular character and the mascot of the Dragon Quest series. It have been also placed on a multitude of different kinds of merchandise.

Concept and design

According to Yuji Horii, the creator of Dragon Quest, the inspiration for the Slimes came from a role-playing game series called Wizardry. Horii said that when it was originally conceived, the Slime was "a pile of goo", but Akira Toriyama's design came back as a tear-drop which they considered "perfect".

There are many different types of Slimes found throughout the Dragon Quest and Rocket Slime series. These include Slimes in different colors; Bubble Slimes which look like pools of slime; Nautical Slimes that wear conch shells; the rare Metal Slimes which have high defense, give out large amounts of experience points, and tend to flee from battle; Healslimes which have tentacles; gem-shaped Slimes like the Emperor Slime; cube-shaped Box Slimes; and King Slimes, which are very large Slimes wearing crowns and come in various versions such as regular or metal.

In most appearances of Slimes, the creature plays an antagonist role, and occasionally appears as a boss. In some Dragon Quest titles, Slimes also appear as friendly non-player characters and peaceful inhabitants of cities. Friendly Slimes usually greet players with the phrase, "I'm not a bad Slime!". Slimes, like many monsters in the Dragon Quest series, have a certain verbal tic, "slurp". Slimes also replace certain words or syllables with the word "goo" (e.g. "human" becomes "gooman"), or other words relating to Slime or goo, when they speak. In 2019, Slime was confirmed to be edible and tasted lime.

Appearances
The Slimes made their first appearance in Dragon Quest as the first and weakest enemy in the game, and have made similar appearances in all subsequent Dragon Quest titles. In Dragon Quest V, the monster is an easily recruitable ally that learns a variety of magic spells. Slimes are also the protagonists of their own spinoff series, beginning with Slime MoriMori Dragon Quest, a Japanese Game Boy Advance title. It was followed by Dragon Quest Heroes: Rocket Slime, which was released worldwide for the Nintendo DS, and the Japanese-exclusive title, Slime Mori Mori Dragon Quest 3 for the Nintendo 3DS. These games follow a nation of Slimes who are intelligent and civilized, but also cute and somewhat comical. In the North American localization of the Dragon Quest games for the Nintendo DS, joking references and puns are made about Slimes. Slimes also appeared in several crossover games along with characters from Nintendo's Mario franchise, such as the Itadaki Street series. Slimes also appear in Super Smash Bros. Ultimate as a stage element on Yggdrasil's Altar, a Spirit, and in one of the Hero's taunts and victory poses.

Cultural impact

Promotion and merchandise

As the most recognizable symbol of one of the best-selling video game series in Japan, the Slime has been featured prominently in Dragon Quest-related merchandise. It has its own section called 'Smile Slime' on the Square Enix JP shopping website. Slime-themed merchandise includes plush toys, pencil cases, keychains, game controllers, a stylus, and several board games including one titled Dragon Quest Slime Racing. Kotaku called the Slime's controller as "unusual", while IGN said that its the "weirdest controller." In Japan, pork filled steam buns designed to look like Slimes are common themed merchandise available for purchase. Convenience store chain Family Mart has added Slime on their food menu. For Dragon Quest's 25th anniversary, special items were sold including business cards, tote bags, and crystal figurines. In 2021, A Slime inspired ice packs, teapot and flair has been also made.

Reception
The Dragon Quest Slime has received positive reception from critics and fans, being called the "most prolific" of all the "memorable" monsters from the series and is one of the most recognizable characters in gaming. The Slime has also been called cute and charming by several critics, especially when reviewing Rocket Slime. GamesRadar listed it as the most lovable blob in video games, calling them the "equivalent of training wheels" due to how easy they are to defeat typically, but also saying that their weird smile makes players think twice about killing them. They also listed it as a character they wished they knew less about. They stated that while they started out as nothing more than things for players to kill and not feel guilty about, the playable role of a Slime in the Dragon Quest Heroes series made them realize they were more than just generic enemies. In the January 2010 issue of Nintendo Power, the editors listed the Slime among its Favorite Punching Bags, a list including Goombas and Octoroks. They wrote that "The Slimes are just so cute and friendly-looking, it's almost hard to slay them. But you know, a hero's gotta do what a hero's gotta do." TheGamer included Slime on their "10 Iconic Monsters From JRPGs, Ranked", stating that "Slimes come in many shapes and sizes and can vary from adorable to horrifying." Destructoid described the encounter of Slime as one of "the iconic first enemy." Jason Schreier of Kotaku calls the Slime as "adorable slime monsters."

Analysis
Reviewers have seen the Slime as symbolic of the Dragon Quest series in the same way that the Moogle represents Final Fantasy. Dragon Quest creator Yuji Horii speculated that the popularity of the Slimes may come from its cuteness, how it is easy to defeat, and while the protagonists change in every Dragon Quest game, the Slimes are always there. GamesRadar speculated that the intense "grinding", or fighting of enemies in the Dragon Quest series exposed players to an abundance of Slimes, but a positive association was created by their familiarity. Yoshiki Watabe, producer of Dragon Quest VIII, hypothesized its popularity came from it being a "well designed character", but "simple", being accessible to anyone.

References

Dragon Quest
Fictional amorphous creatures
Fictional characters who can stretch themselves
Fictional monsters
Shapeshifter characters in video games
Square Enix characters
Square Enix protagonists
Video game bosses
Video game characters introduced in 1986
Video game mascots
Video game species and races
Video game characters designed by Akira Toriyama